Henry Napier may refer to:

 Henry Melville Napier (1854–1940), Scottish rugby union player
 Henry Edward Napier (1789–1853), British naval officer and historian